Abusive power and control (also controlling behavior and coercive control) is behavior used by an abusive person to gain and/or maintain control over another person. Abusers are commonly motivated by devaluation, personal gain, personal gratification, psychological projection, or the enjoyment of exercising power and control. The victims of this behavior are often subject to psychological, physical, mental, sexual, or financial abuse.

Overview
Manipulators and abusers may control their victims with a range of tactics, including, but not limited to, positive reinforcement (such as praise, superficial charm, flattery, ingratiation, love bombing), negative reinforcement (taking away aversive tasks or items), intermittent or partial reinforcement, psychological punishment (such as silent treatment, threats, intimidation, emotional blackmail, guilt trips) and traumatic tactics (such as verbal abuse or explosive anger).

The vulnerabilities of the victim are exploited, with those who are particularly vulnerable being most often selected as targets. Traumatic bonding can occur between abusers and victims as the result of ongoing cycles of abuse in which the intermittent reinforcement of reward and punishment creates powerful emotional bonds (that are resistant to change) and a climate of fear. An attempt may be made to normalise, legitimise, rationalise, deny, or minimise the abusive behaviour, or to blame the victim for it.

Based on statistical evidence, certain personality disorders correlate with abusive tendencies of individuals with those specific personality disorders when also compiled with abusive childhoods themselves.

Personality disorders
In the study of abnormal psychology, certain personality disorders display characteristics involving the need to gain compliance or control over others: There are many different types of personality disorders and they are often characterized by 3 clusters. Individuals with cluster B personality disorders might be more prone to some negative behaviors related to having power and control over others. Cluster B includes narcissistic, histrionic, borderline, and antisocial personality disorder.  

 Individuals with antisocial personality disorder tend to display a superficial charm that helps to disarm others, giving a good likable first impression. If someone likes another person, they're much more apt to comply with them. Because they lack empathy, they see other people as instruments and pawns. The effects of this lack of empathy essentially gives them a grandiose sense of self-worth. Due to their callous and unemotional traits, they are well suited to con and/or manipulate others into complying with their wishes.

 Individuals with borderline personality disorder tend to display black-and-white thinking and are sensitive to others' attitudes toward them. Being so averse to rejection may give them motivation to gain compliance in order to control perceptions of others.
 Individuals with histrionic personality disorder need to be the center of attention; and in turn, draw people in so they may use (and eventually dispose of) their relationship.
 Individuals with narcissistic personality disorder have an inflated self-importance, hypersensitivity to criticism, and a sense of entitlement that compels them to persuade others to comply with their requests. To maintain their self-esteem, and protect their vulnerable true selves, narcissists need to control the behavior of others – particularly that of their children seen as extensions of themselves.
 Individuals with sadistic personality disorder derive pleasure from the distress caused by their aggressive, demeaning, and cruel behavior toward others. They have poor ability to control their reactions and become enraged by minor disturbances, with some sadists being more severely abusive. They use a wide range of behaviors to inappropriately control others, ranging from hostile glances, threats, humiliation, coercion, and restricting the autonomy of others. Often the purpose of their behavior is to control and intimidate others. The sadistic individuals are likely rigid in their beliefs, intolerant of other races or other "out-groups", authoritarian, and malevolent. They may seek positions in which they are able to exert power over others, such as a judge, army sergeant, or psychiatrist who misuse their positions of power to control or brutalize others. For instance, a psychiatrist may institutionalize a patient by misusing mental health legislation.

Law 
In England and Wales, Section 76 of the Serious Crime Act 2015 created a criminal offence for controlling or coercive behavior in an intimate or family relationship.  For the purposes of this offence, behaviour must be engaged in "repeatedly" or "continuously". Another, separate, element of the offence is that it must have a "serious effect" on someone and one way of proving this is that it causes someone to fear, on at least two occasions, that violence will be used against them. There is no specific requirement in the Act that the activity should be of the same nature. The prosecution should be able to show that there was intent to control or coerce someone. For relevant behaviour, it has been criminalised in section 77 of the Serious Crime Act 2015. In 2018, Jordan Worth became the first woman to be convicted under this new law.

In 2019, Ireland enacted the Domestic Violence Act 2018, which allowed for the practice of coercive control to be identifiable based upon its effects on the victim.  In 2019, the UK government made teaching about what coercive control was a mandatory part of the education syllabus on relationships. 

In the United States, to assist in preventing and stopping domestic violence with children, there have been laws put into place to mandate report in specific professions, such as teacher, doctor, or care provider, any suspected abuse happening in the home.

See also

References

External links
 Sarah Strudwick (Nov 16, 2010) Dark Souls – Mind Games, Manipulation and Gaslighting

Power (social and political) concepts
Control (social and political)
Abuse
Narcissism
Psychological abuse
Psychological manipulation
Domestic violence
Intimate relationships